The Nimrod Glacier is a major glacier about 135 km (85 mi) long, flowing from the polar plateau in a northerly direction through the Transantarctic Mountains between the Geologists and Miller Ranges, then northeasterly between the Churchill Mountains and Queen Elizabeth Range, and finally spilling into Shackleton Inlet and the Ross Ice Shelf between Capes Wilson and Lyttelton.

It was photographed from the air by USN Operation Highjump, 1946–47. The name, given by US-ACAN, is in association with Shackleton Inlet and is for the Nimrod, the ship of the British Antarctic Expedition (1907–09) under Ernest Shackleton.

See also
 List of glaciers in the Antarctic

References

External links 

Glaciers of Shackleton Coast
Oates Land